The Great Brain is a 1978 American film directed by Sidney Levin.

Plot summary
In 1890s Utah the adolescent Tom Fitzgerald has a reputation as a schemer.  Calling himself "The Great Brain", Tom delights in swindling his friends and the residents of his small town. Soon the townsfolk tire of being bamboozled, and Tom finally faces his comeuppance. In the end Tom uses his great brain to save the day and redeem himself. After his friend Andy loses his leg to gangrene and becomes depressed, Tom convinces Andy he can still do chores and play. Tom learns that helping people is more rewarding than swindling them.

Cast
Jimmy Osmond as Tom Fitzgerald
Pat Delaney
Fran Ryan as Aunt Bertha
Cliff Osmond
Arthur Roberts
Lynn Benisch
Len Birman
James Jarnigan
John Fredric Hart

Production
Parts of the film were shot in Salt Lake City, Provo, and Orem in Utah.

References

External links

1978 films
1978 comedy films
Films based on American novels
American comedy films
Films scored by Don Costa
Films shot in Utah
1970s English-language films
1970s American films